Jimmy Humes (born 6 August 1942) is an English former professional footballer who played as a winger. He played in The Football League for four clubs.

Playing career
Humes began his career with Preston North End, making his debut aged 17 in a Division One match against Nottingham Forest. After a spell with Bristol Rovers, Humes joined Chester in July 1963.

He spent four years at Chester, with the most memorable season being 1964–65. Along with teammates Mike Metcalf, Elfed Morris, Hugh Ryden and Gary Talbot, Humes managed to score 20 first-team goals. This included a diving header to give Chester the lead at Manchester United in the FA Cup, although United recovered to win 2–1.

Humes moved to Barnsley in July 1967, where he ended his professional career with seven league appearances. After spending a year playing for non-league side Chorley, Humes retired from playing and went on to work for housing department for Carlisle City Council.

Honours

Barnsley

Division Four runners-up: 1967–68 (7 apps, 1 goal).

External links
Career stats

References

1942 births
Living people
Footballers from Carlisle, Cumbria
English footballers
Association football wingers
English Football League players
Preston North End F.C. players
Bristol Rovers F.C. players
Chester City F.C. players
Barnsley F.C. players
Chorley F.C. players